A national flag is a flag that represents and symbolizes a country. Flags come in many shapes and designs, which often represent something about the country or people that the flag represents. Common design elements of flags include shapes such as stars, stripes, and crosses, layout elements such as including a canton (a rectangle with a distinct design, such as another national flag), and the overall shape of a flag, such as the aspect ratio of a rectangular flag (whether the flag is square or rectangle, and how wide it is) or the choice of a non-rectangular flag. Sometimes these flags are used to represent languages.

Many countries with shared history, culture, ethnicity, or religion have similarities in their flags that represent this connection. Sets of flags in this list within the same category may represent countries' shared connections, or the design similarity may be a coincidence.

Flags of uncommon shapes

* Most common aspect ratio is 2:3, followed by 1:2.
: Aspect ratio of 13:15
: Aspect ratio of 189:335
: Aspect ratio of 4:5
: The only national flag that is not rectangular, being made with 5 sides. Bordering aspect ratio of ~ 5:6
: Aspect ratio of 6:7
: The largest aspect ratio of any national flag, the flag's width 2.545 times as large as the height. Aspect ratio of 11:28
: (Square-shaped) Aspect ratio of  1:1 
: The golden ratio which is roughly 1.618035 ; Aspect ratio of 2:3.23607 or ~ 8:13
: Undefined. The aspect ratio is usually defined around 1:1. However, it is not exactly 1:1.

Star

One five-pointed star in center 

 (unrecognized)

 (1946–1992)

See also the list of flags featuring crescents, below, many of which include a five-pointed star in the crescent.

One five-pointed star on hoist 

  (unincorporated territory of the United States)

One five-pointed star on canton

Multiple five-pointed stars of equal size 
 (unrecognized) (7)
 (9, 2 of which are half stars)
 (4)
 (4)
 (5)
  (5)
  (partly recognized) (6)
 (2)
 (3)
 (2)
 (2)
 (5)
 (5)
 (2)
 (7)
 (5)
 (9)
 (varies, based on number of states, currently 50)
 (12)
 (8)

Circle of five-pointed stars 
 (10 stars)
 (associated state of New Zealand) (15 stars)
 (10 stars)
 (12 stars)

Multiple five-pointed stars in different sizes 

 (varies, based on number of states, currently 27)
 (7)
 (4)
 (associated state of  New Zealand) (5)
 (5)
 (5)
 (5)
  (special administrative region of China) (5)

Six-pointed

 (Netherlands Caribbean)

Many-pointed

One many-pointed star

 (7 points)
 (14 points)
 (24 points)
 (12 points)
 (8 points)

Multiple many-pointed stars

 (one 5-pointed star, five 7-pointed)

Southern Cross

 (external territory of Australia)

Stars and stripes

 (4 Points and 2 Stripes)
 
 (10, 5 pointed stars)

 (3, 5 pointed stars)

  (unincorporated territory of the United States)
   (unrecognized)

  (unrecognized)

 (unrecognized)

Crescents

Facing up

Facing fly 

 (autonomous republic of Uzbekistan)

 (partly recognized)
 (unrecognized)

Facing diagonally

Circle

One circle in center

One circle on hoist

 (autonomous territory of Denmark)

  (French overseas collectivity)

One broken or implied circle 

 (2013-2021)

 (associated state of New Zealand)

 (various organisations)
 (French overseas territory)
  (US overseas territory)

Triangle

Triangle(s) in centre

 (6 that make up the shape, 2 to draw it)

Triangle(s) on hoist

 (disputed)

 (unrecognized)

Horizontal stripes in two colors

Two horizontal stripes

Equal 

 (UK constituent country)

Unequal 

 (1951–1991)
 (UK overseas territory)
 (1950–1992)

Thin and thick 

 (1949-1975)

Three horizontal stripes

Equal 

 (1918–1919, 1991–1995)

Thin-and-thick 

 (overseas collectivity of France)
 (US overseas territory)

 (unrecognized)

Fimbriated thin-and-thick

Many equal horizontal stripes

Horizontal stripes in three colors

Three horizontal stripes

Equal 

 (unrecognized)

 (autonomous region in Iraq)

 (overseas collectivity of France)

 (partly recognized)

 (unrecognized)
 (unrecognized)

 (unrecognized)

 (semi-autonomous region in Tanzania)

Unequal 

 (1974–1978)

 (disputed)

Five unequal horizontal stripes

Horizontal stripes in more colors

Four equal horizontal stripes in four colors

Five equal horizontal stripes in five colors 
 (1912-1928)

Vertical stripes

Two equal vertical stripes in two colors

Two unequal vertical stripes in two colors 
 (Constituent republic of the Soviet Union)

Two unequal serrated vertical stripes in two colors

Three equal vertical stripes in two colors

Three equal vertical stripes in three colors 

 (2013-2021)

 (1962–2001)

Three unequal vertical stripes 

 (Australian external territory)

Cross flags 

 – Jerusalem cross
 – Saltire

Nordic Cross flag 

 (autonomous region of Finland)

 (autonomous territory within the Kingdom of Denmark)

 (province of Sweden)

Saint George's Cross 

 (UK crown dependency)

Diagonal stripes

Two diagonal stripes 

 (external territory of Australia)

Three fimbriated diagonal stripes

Many radiating diagonal stripes 

 (6)
 (3)
 (4)
 (5)

Pall

Cross

Upright centred cross

Saint George's Cross

 (UK constituent country)
 (UK crown dependency)

Nordic Cross

Nordic Cross in two colors

 (province of Sweden)

 (1397-1523)

Nordic Cross in three colors

 (autonomous region of Finland)
 (autonomous territory within the Kingdom of Denmark)

One cross in emblem

 (UK overseas territory)

Diagonal cross

 (1976–1977)

St. Andrew's Cross
 (UK crown dependency)
 (UK constituent country)

Upright and diagonal centred crosses

 (1707–1801)

Union Jack

Additionally, the Union Jack features in many territorial and sub-national flags. These are often Red Ensigns (e.g.) or Blue Ensigns (e.g.,  and ). A small number have backgrounds of other colors (e.g.  and ) or a unique pattern in the field (e.g.  and ). A small number put the Union Jack somewhere other than the canton (e.g. ). Unofficial flags, such as  also use it.

Historically 
 (1901–1903)
 (1903–1908)
 (1910–1999)
 (1868–1921)
 (1921–1957)
 (1957–1965) 
 (1707–1801)
 (1907–1949)
 (1928–1994)
 (1910–1928)
 (1976–1978)
 (1978–1996)
 (1775–1777)

Divisions

Upper left divided from rest of flag

A canton in a flag is a rectangular area at the top hoist corner of a flag, occupying up to a quarter of the flag's area. The canton of a flag may be a flag in its own right. For instance, British ensigns have the Union Jack as their canton, as do their derivatives such as the national flags of Australia and New Zealand. Following the practice of British ensigns, a canton sometimes contains a symbol of national unity such as the blue field and white stars of the U.S. flag. In these cases, the canton may be called simply the union.

The U.S. flag's canton derives from the British use of the Union Jack in the canton of its possessions (including, historically, the early United States). Subsequently, many New World nations (and other later countries and regions, such as Liberia or Malaysia) that were inspired by the U.S. incorporated elements likewise inspired by the U.S. flag. As a result, many extant uses of a prominent canton derive either from British territorial history, or U.S. influence and inspiration.

 (Taiwan)

Historically
 (1918–1921)
 (1951-1990) (Constituent republic of the Soviet Union)
 (1990–2004)
 (1974–2010)

One vertical stripe on hoist

 (unrecognized)

 (1852–1902)

Four equal rectangles meeting at center
See also #Cross section

 (UK crown dependency)

Four equal triangles meeting at center

 (UK crown dependency)
 (1976–1977)

St. Andrew's Cross

Cross of Burgundy

Other symbols and pictures

Sun

 (flown only on Taiwan after 1949)

Moon

 (1971–1997)

Human and body parts

  (unrecognized)
  (UK crown dependency)

Animal

Bird

 (UK overseas territory) — sea gulls and turtles
 — condor and llama
 (external territory of Australia) — bird (golden bosun bird)
 — sisserou parrot
 — condor
 — White pelican and yellow lion
 — quetzal
 — frigatebird
 — raggiana bird-of-paradise
 (UK overseas territory) — Saint Helena plover
 (constituent country of the Netherlands) — pelican
 — grey crowned crane
 — Zimbabwe Bird

Eagle

 — double-headed eagle
 (state version) — eagle
 — Eagle of Saladin
 (state version) — eagle
 — steppe eagle
 — eagle and snake
 — eagle and aurochs
 — double-headed eagle and lion
 (state version) — eagle
 — double-headed eagle
 (US overseas territory) — eagle
 — African fish eagle

Livestock

 — two cows
 — condor and llama
 — leopard, goat and marten
 — St. George on a horse, fighting a dragon.
 — eagle and aurochs
 — horse

Lion

 — pelican, yellow lion
 (self-governing dependency of the UK) — lion
 — double-headed eagle, lion
 — lion
 — golden lion
 (Australian state) — lion

Historically
 — lion, fish
 — lion
 — lion
 – lion and sun

Coat of arms

 (2013-2021)

  (civil flag is without the arms)

  (civil flag is without the arms)
  (civil flag is without the arms) 

  (civil flag is without the arms)

  (civil flag is without the arms)

  (civil flag is without the arms)

  (civil flag is without the arms)

Weaponry

 — machete
 — (trident-head)
 — cannon, rifles and axe
 — spears and shield
 — rifles
 — cannon
 — spears and Maasai shield
 — AK-47 with a bayonet and axe
 — swords and Khanjar
 — sword
 — sword
 — sword, sabre and three lances

Ships

 (overseas collectivity of France)

Agricultural and industrial tools

 — half-gear and machete
 (state version) — broken chain, hammer and sickle (non-communist)
 — axes, saw
 (1959–1990) – hammer, compass
 — hoe
 (1974–2010) — gear
 (1917–1991) — hammer and sickle

 

 Transnistria — hammer and sickle

Plants

 — palm, laurel and olive branches
 — maple leaf
 — olive branches
 — clove of nutmeg
 — olive branch
 — silk-cotton tree
 — sugarcane, coconut palm, banana
 (special administrative region in China) — Hong Kong orchid
 — Lebanon cedar
 (special administrative region in China) — lotus flower
 — cactus
 (1974–2010) — rice plant
 — leaves of namele tree

Fleur-de-lis
 (overseas department of France)
 (province of Canada)
 (1992-1998)
 (overseas collectivity of France)

Map

 (1971)

 (external territory of Australia)

 (partly recognized)

Building

 (2013-2021) — mosque
 — church (Chapel of the Sacred Heart of Jesus)
 — Angkor Wat
 (UK overseas territory) — castle
 — seven castles
 — three castles
 (constituent country of the Netherlands) — courthouse
 — castle

Square

Other symbols

 (1920–1939) (King's Crown)
 (Bible)
 (Ashoka Chakra)
 (Emblem of Iran)
 (UK crown dependency) (triskelion)
 (Soyombo)
 (sun with a crown of the traditional Kyrgyz yurt)
 — book
 (diamonds in a V pattern)
 (Taegeuk and four black trigrams)
 (Hand holding Leading Torch, 1971–1997)

Text

Country name

 (state flag)
 – the text reads "Jumhūriyyat Miṣr al-ʿArabiyyah" in Arabic meaning "Arab Republic of Egypt".
 (US overseas territory)
 (overseas department of France)

 (state flag)

Country name and motto

 (2013-2021) – the lowest line of text reads Afghanistan in the Pashto alphabet, and the calligraphic text at the top is the Shahada with the Takbir written beneath it.
 – the line of text on the crescent reads "Always render service with God's guidance", while the lower line reads Brunei Darussalam, both in the Jawi script.
 – the name of the country encircles the coat of arms, which features the motto "Dios, Unión, Libertad" (Spanish for "God, Unity, Freedom") inside.
 – the motto "Dios, Patria, Libertad" (meaning "God, Homeland, Freedom" in Spanish) can be read above the coat of arms at the center, below is the name of the country.

Motto

  (under an unrecognized government) – the Shahada (an Islamic creed meaning "There is no god but Allah and Muhammad is his Prophet") written in the  Thuluth script.
 – "VIRTVS VNITA FORTIOR", Classical Latin for "United virtue is stronger".
 – "Sub Umbra Floreo", meaning "Under the Shade I Flourish" in Latin.
 – "Ordem e Progresso", meaning "Order and Progress" in Portuguese.
 – "Unidad, Paz, Justicia", meaning "Unity, Peace, Justice" in Spanish
 –  the Takbir ("Allahu akbar", which means "God is [the] greatest") written in the  Kufic script 11 times.
 – the Takbir written in the  Kufic script.
 – "LIBERTAS", Latin for "Freedom".
 – the Shahada (an Islamic creed meaning "There is no god but Allah and Muhammad is his Prophet") written in the  Thuluth script.
 – the Shahada
 – "PLVS VLTRA", Latin for "Further beyond".

Other texts
 
 – the name of the short lived and unrecognized state "California Republic", which preceded California's admission into the Union.
 – the Bible is opened to the Gospel of John, chapter 8, verse 32, which reads “Y la verdad los hará libres”, which translates to “And the truth shall set you free” from Spanish.
 – "Libertad 15 de septiembre de 1821", a combination of the Spanish word for "Freedom" and the date of independence of the former Federal Republic of Central America from Spain.
 –  "L'union fait la force" (meaning "Union makes strength" in French), which is different from the country's official motto "Liberté, égalité, fraternité".
 – "For Gallantry" can be read at the George Cross carried in the canton.

Flags of another state

Historically 
 (1868–1921)
 (1921–1957)
 (1957–1965)
 (19th century)
  (1928–1994)
 (1776–1777)

See also 
 Flag families
 Gallery of sovereign state flags
 Vexillology

References

External links
Extensive list of similar flags from around the world

Flag style
 Style
Vexillology